Eleutherodactylus maestrensis is a species of frogs in the family Eleutherodactylidae endemic to Cuba. Its natural habitat is subtropical or tropical moist montane forest.

References

maestrensis
Endemic fauna of Cuba
Amphibians of Cuba
Amphibians described in 2005
Taxonomy articles created by Polbot